Joy McCullough is an American author of young adult fiction. She is best known for her verse novel Blood Water Paint. She lives in Seattle, Washington. She attended Northwestern University.

Writing career 
Blood Water Paint is a verse novel of biographical fiction for young adults. Its subject is Italian baroque painter Artemisia Gentileschi, who was raped and took her attacker to court. It is the tenth novel written by McCullough and it was the first of her books published. McCullough, whose background was as a playwright and not as a poet, first developed Blood Water Paint as a play that was produced in 2015. She read transcripts from the rape trial, which had been translated into English, in her research.

Blood Water Paint received starred reviews from Publishers Weekly and School Library Journal. The Horn Book called it "a powerful novel." Publishers Weekly wrote, "A haunting, stirring depiction of an unforgettable woman" and School Library Journal wrote, "McCullough’s beautifully crafted text will inspire upper-middle/high school readers to research the true story upon which this powerful piece of historical fiction is based. The poetry is clear and revelatory, exploring Artemisia’s passion for both art and life." Blood Water Paint was longlisted for National Book Foundation's 2018 National Book Award for Young People’s Literature. It was named one of the year's ten best historical fiction novels for youth by Booklist. The audiobook was read by Xe Sands.

In 2020, McCullough published A Field Guide for Getting Lost.

On March 8, 2022 Tess Sharpe, Caroline Tung Richmond, Jessica Spotswood and her are going to release the novel Great or nothing, a retelling of the classic Little Women, set in the second World War.

Works 
 Blood Water Paint. Dutton, 2017.
 A Field Guide to Getting Lost. Atheneum, 2020.

References

Further reading 

 Interview about Blood Water Paint with School Library Journal 
Review of Blood Water Paint in The New Yorker
 Kling, Caitlin. Booklist, October 15, 2017, review of Blood Water Paint, p. 48.
Leeper, Angela. BookPage, March 2018, review of Blood Water Paint, p. 28.
Vardell, Sylvia M. "New Voices in Poetry: Six debut writers introduce their upcoming or recently released books and discuss working in verse." Booklist, Vol. 115, Issue 1. Sept. 1, 2018.
Voice of Youth Advocates, Review of Blood Water Paint, February 2018, p. 58.

External links 
Official website

American writers of young adult literature
American young adult novelists
Living people
Year of birth missing (living people)
Writers from Seattle
American women novelists
21st-century American novelists
21st-century American women writers